ShoeMall.com is an online shop for men’s and women’s footwear based in Chippewa Falls, Wisconsin.   They are an entirely web based retailer developed in 1999 by parent company- Mason Companies.

History 
ShoeMall.com was founded in 1999 in Chippewa Falls, Wisconsin.  It was founded by the parent company, Mason Companies, which is a family owned business founded in 1904 by August and Bert Mason.

In 1985, Mason started testing direct-to-consumer mail order catalogs featuring shoes and clothing for men and women. After years of direct sales interactions, the Mason salesmen program was eliminated on December 31, 1997, turning entirely to selling directly to the consumer through catalogs.

Following the success of the mail order catalogs, and the boom of internet retailing, Mason began ShoeMall.com, an entirely web-based subset of their company.  ShoeMall was launched in 1999 as an online footwear retailer.

The Better Business Bureau address an average of 120 complaints against Shoemall and its parent company annually.  As of November 4, 2019, the company earned a BBB rating of "F".

References 

Shoe companies of the United States
Online retailers of the United States
American companies established in 1999
Retail companies established in 1999
Internet properties established in 1999
Footwear retailers of the United States
1999 establishments in Wisconsin